Asprocottus platycephalus is a species of ray-finned fish belonging to the family Cottidae, the typical sculpins. It was described by Dmitrii Nikolaevich Taliev in 1955, originally as a subspecies of Asprocottus herzensteini. It is a freshwater fish which is endemic to Lake Baikal, Russia. It is known to dwell at a depth range of 50–800 metres, most commonly between 250 and 460 m. Males can reach a maximum total length of 10.5 centimetres.

References

platycephalus
Fish described in 1955
Taxa named by Dmitrii Nikolaevich Taliev
Fish of Lake Baikal